SAY Magazine is Indigenous lifestyle Magazine, publishing stories about Indigenous Peoples predominantly in North America.  The magazine was started in 2002, and focuses on telling positive stories about Indigenous people, organizations, and communities. As a bi-monthly publication, it is published six times per year. SAY Magazine is a contemporary lifestyle publication that celebrates First Nations, Métis and Inuit ingenuity by sharing success stories and stories of resilience. It is a variety publication that covers multiple topic areas including business, education, culture and language, law and justice, arts and entertainment, sports and wellness, as well as grassroots community initiatives. 
In addition to 4 seasonal issues, SAY Magazine publishes a post-secondary Indigenous Education Guide provided free of charge to secondary schools to help guide students in their higher education choices.

Leslie Lounsbury, Métis, founded SAY (Spirit of Aboriginal Youth) Magazine in 2002. Originally from Wabowden, (Manitoba, Canada) Lounsbury spent much of her life working to develop meaningful partnerships and to enhance the lives of Indigenous Peoples across North America, spreading messages of hope and resilience with the promise of reaching the next generation of healers and leaders through SAY Magazine. Leslie Lounsbury passed into the spirit world on May 27, 2018. She will always be remembered as a pioneer for the work she has done in her life as a teacher and as a publisher.

References

External links
 saymag.com – official website

First Nations magazines
Magazines established in 2002
Magazines published in Manitoba
Mass media in Winnipeg
Quarterly magazines published in Canada
Youth magazines published in Canada